In quantum mechanics, the Mott problem is a paradox that illustrates some of the difficulties of understanding the nature of wave function collapse and measurement in quantum mechanics.  The problem was first formulated in 1929 by Sir Nevill Francis Mott and Werner Heisenberg, illustrating the paradox of the collapse of a spherically symmetric wave function into the linear tracks seen in a cloud chamber.

In practice, virtually all high energy physics experiments, such as those conducted at particle colliders, involve wave functions which are inherently spherical. Yet, when the results of a particle collision are detected, they are invariably in the form of linear tracks (see, for example, the illustrations accompanying the article on bubble chambers). It is somewhat strange to think that a spherically symmetric wave function should be observed as a straight track, and yet, this occurs on a daily basis in all particle collider experiments.

A related variant formulation was given in 1953 by Mauritius Renninger, and is now known as Renninger's negative-result gedanken experiment.  In this formulation, it is noted that the absence of a particle detection can also constitute a quantum measurement; namely, that a measurement can be performed even if no particle whatsoever is detected.

Mott's analysis
In the original 1929 formulation by Mott and Heisenberg, the spherical wave function of an alpha ray emitted from the decay of a radioactive atomic nucleus was considered. It was noted that the result of such a decay is always observed as  linear tracks seen in Wilson's cloud chamber. Intuitively, one might think that such a wave function should randomly ionize atoms throughout the cloud chamber, but this is not the case. Mott demonstrated that by considering the interaction in configuration space, where all of the atoms of the cloud chamber play a role, it is overwhelmingly probable that all of the condensed droplets in the cloud chamber will lie close to the same straight line. What is uncertain is which straight line the wave packet will reduce to; the probability distribution of straight tracks is spherically symmetric.

Modern applications
In modern times, the Mott problem is occasionally considered theoretically in the context of astrophysics and cosmology, where the evolution of the wave function from the Big Bang or other astrophysical phenomena is considered.

See also
 Spontaneous symmetry breaking

References

 Nevill Mott, "The Wave Mechanics of α-Ray Tracks", Proceedings of the Royal Society (1929) A126, pp. 79-84, . (reprinted as Sec.I-6 of Quantum Theory and Measurement, J.A. Wheeler. and W.H. Zurek, (1983) Princeton).

Quantum measurement